Rovers is a British comedy television series that aired on Sky One. The first and only series began on 24 May 2016 and ended on 28 June 2016.

Production
The series was first announced on 14 December 2015. The exterior stadium shots were filmed at Church Lane, the home venue of New Mills A.F.C. in New Mills, Derbyshire.

Story
The series revolves around a football club in the Midlands of England and the social lives of its local members. The entire series takes place at the club, which has been run by Doreen for 25 years. The locals include Pete "Mete Pott" Mott, the club's most fanatic member, Pete's best friend Tel and his boyfriend Mel, Willy and his blind mother Francis, troublesome twosome Lee and Bruce and local woman Mandy.

Music
While there is no opening credits sequence, each episode begins with an instrumental rendition of "You Are My Sunshine" or The White Stripes' "Seven Nation Army".

Cast
Sue Johnston as Doreen, owner of the club and chief barmaid.
Lolly Adefope as Sam, new barmaid of the club.
Craig Cash as Pete Mott, the team's biggest fan. He must deal with club's poor performances and the feeling he's losing Tel.
Steve Speirs as Terrence "Tel", Pete's best friend. He has recently come out of the closet and spends more and more time with his boyfriend Melvin.
Jamie Demetriou as Tom, local man. Tom was in foster care and was then homeless until Pete took him in.
Seb Cardinal as Melvin "Mel", the mildly flamboyant boyfriend of Tel.
Joe Wilkinson as Lee, local man. He enjoys ragging on Pete and his Rovers cohort.
David Earl as Bruce, brother of Lee. They are two of a set of triplets, although the third sibling is never seen.
Diane Morgan as  Mandy, local woman known for her unpredictable proclivities.
Pearce Quigley as Willy, local man. Son of Francis, he lives with and looks after his blind mother.
Judith Barker as Francis, local woman. She is blind and relies on the attention and care of her son Willy, often inconveniencing his social life.

Episodes

Series 1 (2016)

References

External links 
 
 

2010s British sitcoms
2016 British television series debuts
2016 British television series endings
Sky sitcoms
English-language television shows
Television shows set in Derbyshire